Henry Rogo (born 29 October 1968) is a Fijian sprinter. He competed in the men's 4 × 100 metres relay at the 1996 Summer Olympics.

References

External links

1968 births
Living people
Athletes (track and field) at the 1996 Summer Olympics
Fijian male sprinters
Olympic athletes of Fiji
Place of birth missing (living people)